Mohd Farid bin Ramli (born 28 April 1987 in Johor) is a Malaysian footballer who plays as a left-back.

Born in Johor, Farid started his football career with Johor youth team.

Club career

Felda United
For 2017 season, Farid signed a one-year contract with Felda United. He spent most of his time at the bench during his time with the club.

Kuala Lumpur
On 1 June 2017, Farid agreed to join Kuala Lumpur for a loan deal. After his contract with Felda United expired he permanently signed a contract with the club.

Career statistics

Club

References

External links
 

1987 births
Living people
Malaysian footballers
People from Johor
Malaysian people of Malay descent
Felda United F.C. players
Sarawak United FC players
Association football fullbacks